Hoz may refer to:

People
 De la Hoz, a Spanish surname
 Dov Hoz (1894–1940), Russian Jewish Zionist
 Shmaryahu Hoz (born 1945), Israeli chemist

Places 
 Hoz y Costean, Huesca, Aragon, Spain
 Hoz de Jaca, Huesca, Aragon, Spain
 La Hoz de la Vieja, Teruel, Aragon, Spain

Other uses 
 Hozo language, spoken in Ethiopia
 Howwood railway station, in Scotland